Vladem Lázaro Ruiz Quevedo (April 15, 1935 – March 28, 2007), known as "Delém", was a Brazilian footballer who played as a forward for clubs in Brazil, Argentina and Chile. He played seven games and scored five goals for the Brazil national team, all in 1960.

Notes

References

External links
 
 
 

1935 births
2007 deaths
Brazilian footballers
Association football forwards
Brazil international footballers
Grêmio Foot-Ball Porto Alegrense players
CR Vasco da Gama players
Club Atlético River Plate footballers
Club Deportivo Universidad Católica footballers
Chilean Primera División players
Argentine Primera División players
Brazilian football managers
Club Atlético Huracán managers
Club Atlético River Plate managers
Brazilian expatriate footballers
Brazilian expatriate sportspeople in Chile
Expatriate footballers in Chile
Brazilian expatriate sportspeople in Argentina
Expatriate footballers in Argentina
Footballers from São Paulo